Atkinson Glacier is a glacier between Findlay Range and Lyttelton Range, Admiralty Mountains, flowing northward into Dennistoun Glacier. Named by the New Zealand Antarctic Place-Names Committee in 1983 after William Atkinson, field assistant, New Zealand Antarctic Division, mechanic with the New Zealand Antarctic Research Program (NZARP) geological party to the area, 1981–82, led by R.H. Findlay.

See also
 List of glaciers in the Antarctic
 Glaciology

References
 

Admiralty Mountains
Glaciers of Pennell Coast